State Route 291 is a  long state highway located in Spokane and Stevens counties in the U.S. state of Washington. The highway begins at an intersection with concurrent highways U.S. Route 2 (US 2) and US 395 and travels northwest to an intersection with SR 231. It connects the north side of Spokane with a string of communities along the north bank of the Spokane River including Nine Mile Falls, Suncrest and Tumtum.

Route description

SR 291 begins at an intersection with US 2 / US 395, named North Division Street, and West Francis Avenue in the Town and Country and North Hill neighborhoods of Spokane. The highway travels west along West Francis Avenue through western Spokane, before turning northwest along North Nine Mile Road in the Balboa/South Indian Trail neighborhood. The highway begins to parallel the Spokane River as it passes a golf course and then through the community of Nine Mile Falls. The highway continues northwest, entering Stevens County from Spokane County, just east of the Nine Mile Falls Dam, as it crosses the Little Spokane River. It then climbs and shifts further north of the river to accommodate a housing development at Suncrest. Entering the community of Tumtum the highway turns southwest, snaking around Long Lake before turning west and terminating at SR 231.

Every year the Washington State Department of Transportation (WSDOT) conducts a series of surveys on its highways in the state to measure traffic volume. This is expressed in terms of average annual daily traffic (AADT), which is a measure of traffic volume for any average day of the year. In 2009, WSDOT calculated that as few as 360 cars traveled through the intersection with Corkscrew Canyon Road near the northern terminus, and as many as 30,000 cars passed through the intersection with Ash Street in downtown Spokane.

History
Before the 1964 state highway renumbering, the portion of SR 291 between Spokane and the Stevens County line was designated Secondary State Highway 3S. An extension following the Spokane River from SR 231 to SR 25 on the Columbia River was proposed in the late 1960s. A study by the Washington State Department of Highways was completed in 1968 and determined that it would cost $15 million and would be "difficult to justify" due to its low traffic.

Major intersections

References

External links

Highways of Washington State

291
Transportation in Spokane County, Washington
Transportation in Stevens County, Washington